Hampshire Township is a township in Clinton County, Iowa, USA.  As of the 2000 census, its population was 877.

History
Hampshire Township was organized in 1857.

Geography
According to the USGS, it contains three cemeteries: Dierks, Holy Cross and Pleasant Hill.

Notes

References
 USGS Geographic Names Information System (GNIS)

External links
 US-Counties.com
 City-Data.com

Townships in Clinton County, Iowa
Townships in Iowa
1857 establishments in Iowa
Populated places established in 1857